Strašnik  is a village in Croatia. The epicenter of 2020 Petrinja earthquake was located in the village.

Populated places in Sisak-Moslavina County